Catoctin High School (CHS) is a four-year public high school in Thurmont, Frederick County, Maryland, United States.

Athletics
The following sports are offered at Catoctin:

Cheerleading
Cross country
Field hockey
Football
Golf
Soccer
Volleyball
Basketball
Swimming & diving
Indoor track
Wrestling
Baseball
Lacrosse
Softball
Tennis
Track
Unified Bocce 
Unified Tennis
Unified Track

References

External links
 Catoctin High School Website

Public high schools in Maryland
Schools in Frederick County, Maryland
Educational institutions established in 1969
1969 establishments in Maryland